The Flyweight competition at the 2017 AIBA World Boxing Championships was held from 26 August to 2 September 2017.

Draw

Final

Top half

Bottom half

References

External links
Draw

Flyweight